Cortisol is a steroid hormone, in the glucocorticoid class of hormones. When used as a medication, it is known as hydrocortisone.

It is produced in many animals, mainly by the zona fasciculata of the adrenal cortex in the adrenal gland. It is produced in other tissues in lower quantities. It is released with a diurnal cycle and its release is increased in response to stress and low blood-glucose concentration. It functions to increase blood sugar through gluconeogenesis, to suppress the immune system, and to aid in the metabolism of fat, protein, and carbohydrates. It also decreases bone formation. Many of these functions are carried out by cortisol binding to glucocorticoid or mineralocorticoid receptors inside the cell, which then bind to DNA to impact gene expression.

Health effects

Metabolic response

Metabolism of glucose 
In general, cortisol stimulates gluconeogenesis (the synthesis of 'new' glucose from non-carbohydrate sources, which occurs mainly in the liver, but also in the kidneys and small intestine under certain circumstances). The net effect is an increase in the concentration of glucose in the blood, further complemented by a decrease in the sensitivity of peripheral tissue to insulin, thus preventing this tissue from taking the glucose from the blood. Cortisol has a permissive effect on the actions of hormones that increase glucose production, such as glucagon and adrenaline.

Cortisol also plays an important, but indirect, role in liver and muscle glycogenolysis (the breaking down of glycogen to glucose-1-phosphate and glucose) which occurs as a result of the action of glucagon and adrenaline. Additionally, cortisol facilitates the activation of glycogen phosphorylase, which is necessary for adrenaline to have an effect on glycogenolysis.

Paradoxically, cortisol promotes not only gluconeogenesis in the liver, but also glycogenesis. Cortisol is thus better thought of as stimulating glucose/glycogen turnover in the liver. This is in contrast to cortisol's effect in the skeletal muscle where glycogenolysis is promoted indirectly through catecholamines.

Metabolism of proteins and lipids 
Elevated levels of cortisol, if prolonged, can lead to proteolysis (breakdown of proteins) and muscle wasting. The reason for proteolysis is to provide the relevant tissue with a feedstock for gluconeogenesis; see glucogenic amino acids. The effects of cortisol on lipid metabolism are more complicated since lipogenesis is observed in patients with chronic, raised circulating glucocorticoid (i.e. cortisol) levels, although an acute increase in circulating cortisol promotes lipolysis. The usual explanation to account for this apparent discrepancy is that the raised blood glucose concentration (through the action of cortisol) will stimulate insulin release. Insulin stimulates lipogenesis, so this is an indirect consequence of the raised cortisol concentration in the blood but it will only occur over a longer time scale.

Immune response 
Cortisol prevents the release of substances in the body that cause inflammation. It is used to treat conditions resulting from overactivity of the B-cell-mediated antibody response. Examples include inflammatory and rheumatoid diseases, as well as allergies. Low-dose topical hydrocortisone, available as a nonprescription medicine in some countries, is used to treat skin problems such as rashes and eczema.

Cortisol inhibits production of interleukin 12 (IL-12), interferon gamma (IFN-gamma), IFN-alpha, and tumor necrosis factor alpha (TNF-alpha) by antigen-presenting cells (APCs) and T helper cells (Th1 cells), but upregulates interleukin 4, interleukin 10, and interleukin 13 by Th2 cells. This results in a shift toward a Th2 immune response rather than general immunosuppression. The activation of the stress system (and resulting increase in cortisol and Th2 shift) seen during an infection is believed to be a protective mechanism which prevents an over-activation of the inflammatory response.

Cortisol can weaken the activity of the immune system. It prevents proliferation of T-cells by rendering the interleukin-2 producer T-cells unresponsive to interleukin-1, and unable to produce the T-cell growth factor IL-2. Cortisol downregulates the expression of the IL2 receptor IL-2R on the surface of the helper T-cell which is necessary to induce a Th1 'cellular' immune response, thus favoring a shift towards Th2 dominance and the release of the cytokines listed above which results in Th2 dominance and favors the 'humoral' B-cell mediated antibody immune response).

Cortisol also has a negative-feedback effect on IL-1.
The way this negative feedback works is that an immune stressor causes peripheral immune cells to release IL-1 and other other cytokines such as IL-6 and TNF-alpha. These cytokines stimulate the hypothalamus, causing it to release corticotropin-releasing hormone (CRH). CRH in turn stimulates the production of adrenocorticotropic hormone (ACTH) among other things in the adrenal gland, which (among other things) increases production of cortisol. Cortisol then closes the loop as it inhibits TNF-alpha production in immune cells and makes them less responsive to IL-1.

Through this system, as long as an immune stressor is small, the response will be regulated to the correct level. Like a thermostat controlling a heater, the hypothalamus uses cortisol to turn off the heat once the production of cortisol matches the stress induced on the immune system. But in a severe infection or in a situation where the immune system is overly sensitized to an antigen (such as in allergic reactions) or there is a massive flood of antigens (as can happen with endotoxic bacteria) the correct set point might never be reached. Also because of downregulation of Th1 immunity by cortisol and other signaling molecules, certain types of infection, (notably Mycobacterium tuberculosis) can trick the body into getting locked in the wrong mode of attack, using an antibody-mediated humoral response when a cellular response is needed.

Lymphocytes include the B-cell lymphocytes that are the antibody-producing cells of the body, and are thus the main agents of humoral immunity. A larger number of lymphocytes in the lymph nodes, bone marrow, and skin means the body is increasing its humoral immune response. B-cell lymphocytes release antibodies into the bloodstream. These antibodies lower infection through three main pathways: neutralization, opsonization, and complement activation. Antibodies neutralize pathogens by binding to surface adhering proteins, keeping pathogens from binding to host cells. In opsonization, antibodies bind to the pathogen and create a target for phagocytic immune cells to find and latch onto, allowing them to destroy the pathogen more easily. Finally antibodies can also activate complement molecules which can combine in various ways to promote opsonization or even act directly to lyse a bacteria. There are many different kinds of antibody and their production is highly complex, involving several types of lymphocyte, but in general lymphocytes and other antibody regulating and producing cells will migrate to the lymph nodes to aid in the release of these antibodies into the bloodstream.

Rapid administration of corticosterone (the endogenous type I and type II receptor agonist) or RU28362 (a specific type II receptor agonist) to adrenalectomized animals induced changes in leukocyte distribution.

On the other side of things, there are natural killer cells; these cells have the ability to take down larger in size threats like bacteria, parasites, and tumor cells. A separate study found that cortisol effectively disarmed natural killer cells, downregulating the expression of their natural cytotoxicity receptors. Interestingly, prolactin has the opposite effect. It increases the expression of cytotoxicity receptors on natural killer cells, increasing their firepower.

Cortisol stimulates many copper enzymes (often to 50% of their total potential), including lysyl oxidase, an enzyme that cross-links collagen and elastin. Especially valuable for immune response is cortisol's stimulation of the superoxide dismutase, since this copper enzyme is almost certainly used by the body to permit superoxides to poison bacteria.

Other effects

Metabolism

Glucose 
Cortisol counteracts insulin, contributes to hyperglycemia by stimulating gluconeogenesis and inhibits the peripheral use of glucose (insulin resistance) by decreasing the translocation of glucose transporters (especially GLUT4) to the cell membrane. Cortisol also increases glycogen synthesis (glycogenesis) in the liver, storing glucose in easily accessible form. The permissive effect of cortisol on insulin action in liver glycogenesis is observed in hepatocyte culture in the laboratory, although the mechanism for this is unknown.

Bone and collagen 
Cortisol reduces bone formation, favoring long-term development of osteoporosis (progressive bone disease). The mechanism behind this is two-fold: cortisol stimulates the production of RANKL by osteoblasts which stimulates, through binding to RANK receptors, the activity of osteoclasts – cells responsible for calcium resorption from bone – and also inhibits the production of osteoprotegerin (OPG) which acts as a decoy receptor and captures some RANKL before it can activate the osteoclasts through RANK. In other words, when RANKL binds to OPG, no response occurs as opposed to the binding to RANK which leads to the activation of osteoclasts.

It transports potassium out of cells in exchange for an equal number of sodium ions (see above). This can trigger the hyperkalemia of metabolic shock from surgery. Cortisol also reduces calcium absorption in the intestine. Cortisol down-regulates the synthesis of collagen.

Amino acid 
Cortisol raises the free amino acids in the serum by inhibiting collagen formation, decreasing amino acid uptake by muscle, and inhibiting protein synthesis. Cortisol (as opticortinol) may inversely inhibit IgA precursor cells in the intestines of calves. Cortisol also inhibits IgA in serum, as it does IgM; however, it is not shown to inhibit IgE.

Electrolyte balance 
Cortisol decreases glomerular filtration rate, and renal plasma flow from the kidneys thus increasing phosphate excretion, as well as increasing sodium and water retention and potassium excretion by acting on mineralocorticoid receptors. It also increases sodium and water absorption and potassium excretion in the intestines.

Sodium 
Cortisol promotes sodium absorption through the small intestine of mammals. Sodium depletion, however, does not affect cortisol levels so cortisol cannot be used to regulate serum sodium. Cortisol's original purpose may have been sodium transport. This hypothesis is supported by the fact that freshwater fish use cortisol to stimulate sodium inward, while saltwater fish have a cortisol-based system for expelling excess sodium.

Potassium 
A sodium load augments the intense potassium excretion by cortisol. Corticosterone is comparable to cortisol in this case. For potassium to move out of the cell, cortisol moves an equal number of sodium ions into the cell. This should make pH regulation much easier (unlike the normal potassium-deficiency situation, in which two sodium ions move in for each three potassium ions that move out—closer to the deoxycorticosterone effect).

Stomach and kidneys 
Cortisol stimulates gastric-acid secretion. Cortisol's only direct effect on the hydrogen-ion excretion of the kidneys is to stimulate the excretion of ammonium ions by deactivating the renal glutaminase enzyme.

Memory
Cortisol works with adrenaline (epinephrine) to create memories of short-term emotional events; this is the proposed mechanism for storage of flash bulb memories, and may originate as a means to remember what to avoid in the future. However, long-term exposure to cortisol damages cells in the hippocampus; this damage results in impaired learning.

Diurnal cycles 

Diurnal cycles of cortisol levels are found in humans.

Stress 
Sustained stress can lead to high levels of circulating cortisol (regarded as one of the more important of the several "stress hormones").

Effects during pregnancy 
During human pregnancy, increased fetal production of cortisol between weeks 30 and 32 initiates production of fetal lung pulmonary surfactant to promote maturation of the lungs. In fetal lambs, glucocorticoids (principally cortisol) increase after about day 130, with lung surfactant increasing greatly, in response, by about day 135, and although lamb fetal cortisol is mostly of maternal origin during the first 122 days, 88% or more is of fetal origin by day 136 of gestation. Although the timing of fetal cortisol concentration elevation in sheep may vary somewhat, it averages about 11.8 days before the onset of labor. In several livestock species (e.g. cattle, sheep, goats, and pigs), the surge of fetal cortisol late in gestation triggers the onset of parturition by removing the progesterone block of cervical dilation and myometrial contraction. The mechanisms yielding this effect on progesterone differ among species. In the sheep, where progesterone sufficient for maintaining pregnancy is produced by the placenta after about day 70 of gestation, the prepartum fetal cortisol surge induces placental enzymatic conversion of progesterone to estrogen. (The elevated level of estrogen stimulates prostaglandin secretion and oxytocin receptor development.)

Exposure of fetuses to cortisol during gestation can have a variety of developmental outcomes, including alterations in prenatal and postnatal growth patterns. In marmosets, a species of New World primates, pregnant females have varying levels of cortisol during gestation, both within and between females. Infants born to mothers with high gestational cortisol during the first trimester of pregnancy had lower rates of growth in body mass indices than infants born to mothers with low gestational cortisol (about 20% lower). However, postnatal growth rates in these high-cortisol infants were more rapid than low-cortisol infants later in postnatal periods, and complete catch-up in growth had occurred by 540 days of age. These results suggest that gestational exposure to cortisol in fetuses has important potential fetal programming effects on both pre and postnatal growth in primates.

Synthesis and release
Cortisol is produced in the human body by the adrenal gland in the zona fasciculata, the second of three layers comprising the adrenal cortex. The cortex forms the outer "bark" of each adrenal gland, situated atop the kidneys. The release of cortisol is controlled by the hypothalamus, a part of the brain. The secretion of corticotropin-releasing hormone by the hypothalamus triggers cells in the neighboring anterior pituitary to secrete another hormone, the adrenocorticotropic hormone (ACTH), into the vascular system, through which blood carries it to the adrenal cortex. ACTH stimulates the synthesis of cortisol and other glucocorticoids, mineralocorticoid aldosterone, and dehydroepiandrosterone.

Testing of individuals 
Normal values indicated in the following tables pertain to humans (normal levels vary among species). Measured cortisol levels, and therefore reference ranges, depend on the sample type (blood or urine), analytical method used, and factors such as age and sex. Test results should, therefore, always be interpreted using the reference range from the laboratory that produced the result.

Using the molecular weight of 362.460 g/mole, the conversion factor from µg/dL to nmol/L is approximately 27.6; thus, 10 µg/dL is about 276 nmol/L.

Cortisol follows a circadian rhythm, and to accurately measure cortisol levels is best to test four times per day through saliva. An individual may have normal total cortisol but have a lower than normal level during a certain period of the day and a higher than normal level during a different period. Therefore, some scholars question the clinical utility of cortisol measurement.

Cortisol is lipophilic, and is transported bound to transcortin (also known as corticosteroid-binding globulin) and albumin, while only a small part of the total serum cortisol is unbound and has biological activity. This binding to the corticosteroid-binding globulin is accomplished through hydrophobic interactions in which cortisol binds in a 1:1 ratio. Serum cortisol assays measures total cortisol, and its results may be misleading for patients with altered serum protein concentrations. The salivary cortisol test avoids this problem because only free cortisol can pass through the salivary barrier.  Transcortin particles are too large to pass through this barrier.

Automated immunoassays lack specificity and show significant cross-reactivity due to interactions with structural analogs of cortisol, and show differences between assays. Liquid chromatography-tandem mass spectrometry (LC-MS/MS) can improve specificity and sensitivity.

Disorders of cortisol production 
Some medical disorders are related to abnormal cortisol production, such as:

 Primary hypercortisolism (Cushing's syndrome): excessive levels of cortisol
 Secondary hypercortisolism (pituitary tumor resulting in Cushing's disease, pseudo-Cushing's syndrome)
 Primary hypocortisolism (Addison's disease, Nelson's syndrome): insufficient levels of cortisol
 Secondary hypocortisolism (pituitary tumor, Sheehan's syndrome)

Regulation 
The primary control of cortisol is the pituitary gland peptide, ACTH, which probably controls cortisol by controlling the movement of calcium into the cortisol-secreting target cells. ACTH is in turn controlled by the hypothalamic peptide corticotropin-releasing hormone (CRH), which is under nervous control. CRH acts synergistically with arginine vasopressin, angiotensin II, and epinephrine. (In swine, which do not produce arginine vasopressin, lysine vasopressin acts synergistically with CRH.)

When activated macrophages start to secrete IL-1, which synergistically with CRH increases ACTH, T-cells also secrete glucosteroid response modifying factor (GRMF), as well as IL-1; both increase the amount of cortisol required to inhibit almost all the immune cells. Immune cells then assume their own regulation, but at a higher cortisol setpoint. The increase in cortisol in diarrheic calves is minimal over healthy calves, however, and falls over time. The cells do not lose all their fight-or-flight override because of interleukin-1's synergism with CRH. Cortisol even has a negative feedback effect on interleukin-1—especially useful to treat diseases that force the hypothalamus to secrete too much CRH, such as those caused by endotoxic bacteria. The suppressor immune cells are not affected by GRMF, so the immune cells' effective setpoint may be even higher than the setpoint for physiological processes. GRMF  affects primarily the liver (rather than the kidneys) for some physiological processes.

High-potassium media (which stimulates aldosterone secretion in vitro) also stimulate cortisol secretion from the fasciculata zone of canine adrenals — unlike corticosterone, upon which potassium has no effect.

Potassium loading also increases ACTH and cortisol in humans. This is probably the reason why potassium deficiency causes cortisol to decline (as mentioned) and causes a decrease in conversion of 11-deoxycortisol to cortisol. This may also have a role in rheumatoid-arthritis pain; cell potassium is always low in RA.

Ascorbic acid presence, particularly in high doses has also been shown to mediate response to psychological stress and speed the decrease of the levels of circulating cortisol in the body post-stress. This can be evidenced through a decrease in systolic and diastolic blood pressures and decreased salivary cortisol levels after treatment with ascorbic acid.

Factors increasing cortisol levels 
 Viral infections increase cortisol levels through activation of the HPA axis by cytokines.
 Intense (high VO2 max) or prolonged aerobic exercise transiently increases cortisol levels to increase gluconeogenesis and maintain blood glucose; however, cortisol declines to normal levels after eating (i.e., restoring a neutral energy balance)
 Severe trauma or stressful events can elevate cortisol levels in the blood for prolonged periods.
 Low-carbohydrate diets cause a short-term increase in resting cortisol (~3 weeks), and increase the cortisol response to aerobic exercise in the short- and long-term.
 Increase in the concentration of ghrelin, the hunger stimulating hormone, increases levels of cortisol.

Biochemistry

Biosynthesis 

Cortisol is synthesized from cholesterol. Synthesis takes place in the zona fasciculata of the adrenal cortex. (The name cortisol is derived from cortex.) While the adrenal cortex also produces aldosterone (in the zona glomerulosa) and some sex hormones (in the zona reticularis), cortisol is its main secretion in humans and several other species. (However, in cattle, corticosterone levels may approach or exceed cortisol levels.). The medulla of the adrenal gland lies under the cortex, mainly secreting the catecholamines adrenaline (epinephrine) and noradrenaline (norepinephrine) under sympathetic stimulation.

The synthesis of cortisol in the adrenal gland is stimulated by the anterior lobe of the pituitary gland with ACTH; ACTH production is, in turn, stimulated by CRH, which is released by the hypothalamus. ACTH increases the concentration of cholesterol in the inner mitochondrial membrane, via regulation of the steroidogenic acute regulatory protein. It also stimulates the main rate-limiting step in cortisol synthesis, in which cholesterol is converted to pregnenolone and catalyzed by Cytochrome P450SCC (side-chain cleavage enzyme).

Metabolism

11beta-hydroxysteroid dehydrogenases
Cortisol is metabolized reversibly to cortisone by the 11-beta hydroxysteroid dehydrogenase system (11-beta HSD), which consists of two enzymes: 11-beta HSD1 and 11-beta HSD2. The metabolism of cortisol to cortisone involves oxidation of the hydroxyl group at the 11-beta position.
 11-beta HSD1 uses the cofactor NADPH to convert biologically inert cortisone to biologically active cortisol
 11-beta HSD2 uses the cofactor NAD+ to convert cortisol to cortisone

Overall, the net effect is that 11-beta HSD1 serves to increase the local concentrations of biologically active cortisol in a given tissue; 11-beta HSD2 serves to decrease local concentrations of biologically active cortisol. If hexose-6-phosphate dehydrogenase (H6PDH) is present, the equilibrium can favor the activity of 11-beta HSD1. H6PDH regenerates NADPH, which increases the activity of 11-beta HSD1, and decreases the activity of 11-beta HSD2.

An alteration in 11-beta HSD1 has been suggested to play a role in the pathogenesis of obesity, hypertension, and insulin resistance known as metabolic syndrome.

An alteration in 11-beta HSD2 has been implicated in essential hypertension and is known to lead to the syndrome of apparent mineralocorticoid excess (SAME).

A-ring reductases (5alpha- and 5beta-reductases)
Cortisol is also metabolized irreversibly into 5-alpha tetrahydrocortisol (5-alpha THF) and 5-beta tetrahydrocortisol (5-beta THF), reactions for which 5-alpha reductase and 5-beta-reductase are the rate-limiting factors, respectively. 5-Beta reductase is also the rate-limiting factor in the conversion of cortisone to tetrahydrocortisone.

Cytochrome P450, family 3, subfamily A monooxygenases
Cortisol is also metabolized irreversibly into 6β-hydroxycortisol by cytochrome p450-3A monooxygenases, mainly, CYP3A4. Drugs that induce CYP3A4 may accelerate cortisol clearance.

Chemistry
Cortisol is a naturally occurring pregnane corticosteroid and is also known as 11β,17α,21-trihydroxypregn-4-ene-3,20-dione.

Animals
In animals, cortisol is often used as an indicator of stress and can be measured in blood, saliva, urine, hair, and faeces.

See also
 Cortisone, a hormone
 Cortisol awakening response
 List of corticosteroids
 Membrane glucocorticoid receptor

References

External links

 Cortisol MS Spectrum
 Cortisol: analyte monograph – The Association for Clinical Biochemistry and Laboratory Medicine

Anxiety
Glucocorticoids
Otologicals
Pregnanes
Stress (biology)